is a former Japanese football player.

Playing career
Morikawa was born in Ishikawa Prefecture on June 29, 1966. After graduating from Osaka University of Health and Sport Sciences, he joined Matsushita Electric (later Gamba Osaka) in 1989. In 1990, the club won the champions Emperor's Cup first major title in the club history. In 1992, he played many matches as defender in J.League Cup. However he could hardly play in the match in 1993. In 1994, he moved to Japan Football League club Kyoto Purple Sanga. He retired end of 1994 season.

Club statistics

References

External links

1966 births
Living people
Osaka University of Health and Sport Sciences alumni
Association football people from Ishikawa Prefecture
Japanese footballers
Japan Soccer League players
J1 League players
Japan Football League (1992–1998) players
Gamba Osaka players
Kyoto Sanga FC players
Association football defenders